The bestselling book and film, Hidden Figures, celebrated the role of African-American women mathematicians in the space race, and the barriers they had to overcome to study and pursue a career in mathematics and related fields. Although much of African Americans' other achievements in careers in mathematical science, in research, education, and applied fields have also been "hidden", the community of mathematicians has been growing. African Americans represented around 4-6% of the graduates majoring in mathematics and statistics in the US between 2000 and 2015. This list catalogs Wikipedia articles on African Americans in mathematics, as well as early recipients of doctoral degrees in mathematics and mathematics education and other landmarks, and books and studies about African-American mathematicians.

Historical landmarks

1792: Benjamin Banneker calculated planetary movements and predicted eclipses in his Almanac.

1867: Howard University established its Department of Mathematics.

1895: Joseph Carter Corbin, president of Branch Normal College (now University of Arkansas at Pine Bluff), published his first problem in American Mathematical Monthly.

1916: Dudley Weldon Woodard became a charter member of the Mathematical Association of America (MAA).

1925: Elbert Frank Cox is the first African-American awarded a doctoral degree in mathematics, from Cornell University.

1929: Dudley Weldon Woodard is the first African-American mathematician known to publish in a mathematics journal, with an article "On two-dimensional analysis situs with special reference to the Jordan curve-theorem" in Fundamenta Mathematicae.

1943: Euphemia Lofton Haynes is the first African-American woman to gain a doctoral degree in mathematics.

1951: The MAA Board of Governors adopted a resolution to conduct their scientific and business meetings, and social gatherings "without discrimination as to race, creed, or color".

1956: Gloria Ford Gilmer is believed to be the first African-American woman to publish mathematical research, co-authoring an article in Proceedings of the American Mathematical Society and another in Pacific Journal of Mathematics.

1969: 17 African-American mathematicians met in New Orleans, forming the National Association of Mathematicians to "promote excellence in the mathematical sciences and to promote the mathematical development of under-represented American minorities".

1973: Mathematician David Blackwell becomes the first African-American in any field to be elected to membership of the National Academy of Sciences.

1976: Howard University establishes the first PhD program in mathematics at a historically black college or university under mathematics department chair James Donaldson and professor J. Ernest Wilkins Jr.

1980: The Claytor Lecture – now the Claytor-Woodard Lecture in honor of William W S Claytor and Dudley Weldon Woodard – is established at MAA.

1982: Civil rights leader, Bob Moses (Student Nonviolent Coordinating Committee), used his MacArthur Fellowship to start the Algebra Project, a national mathematics literacy program for high schools.

1988: The MAA established a task force that led to the formation in 1990 of SUMMA, a program for the Strengthening of Underrepresented Minority Mathematics Achievement.

1992: Mathematician Freeman Hrabowski becomes President of the University of Maryland.

1994: The Blackwell Lecture is established for MAA meetings, jointly by MAA and NAM, as well as the NAM Wilkins Lecture and Bharucha-Reid Lecture.

1995: The first CAARMS – Conference for African American Researchers in Mathematical Sciences – was held, to highlight the work of researchers and students and encourage the careers of under-represented groups in mathematics. Proceedings are published by the American Mathematical Society in its Contemporary Mathematics series.

1995: Gregory Battle becomes first African American awarded doctorate degree in theoretical algebra from Washington University in St. Louis.

1997: Kathleen Adebola Okikiolu was the first African American awarded a Sloan Research Fellowship and Presidential Early Career Award for Scientists and Engineers.

1997 Scott W. Williams produced the website, Mathematicians of the African Diaspora, a collection of African-American mathematicians, newsletter, and resources on Africans in mathematics. By early 2007 it had close to 5 million visitors. The website has been cataloged by the Library of Congress.

1999: The mathematics departments of the 25 highest-ranked universities in the US had more than 900 faculty members, of whom 4 were African-American.

2003: Clarence F. Stephens is the first African-American to be honored with the Mathematical Association of America's (MAA) most prestigious award, for Distinguished Service to Mathematics.

2004: The Association for Women in Mathematics (AWM) and MAA formally established the Etta Zuber Falconer Lecture.

2015: Katherine Coleman Johnson received the Presidential Medal of Freedom.

2016: Hidden Figures, by Margot Lee Shetterley, is published, going on to win multiple awards and reach number 1 on the New York Times bestseller list. It tells the story of African-American women mathematicians at NASA during the space race.

2017: The film adaptation, Hidden Figures, is nominated for best movie at the Academy Awards, and Katherine Johnson makes an appearance at the ceremony.

2020: The updated website Mathematicians of the African Diaspora debuted in October. The new site is supported by the National Association of Mathematicians (NAM) and the Educational Advancement Foundation (EAF).

Doctoral degrees in mathematics

The lists of doctoral degrees, including the Doctor of Philosophy (PhD) in mathematics and Doctor of Education (EdD), draw from these sources: Turner (1971), Greene (1974), Williams (1997), Zeitz (2008), Shakil (2010), and the Mathematical Association of America.
(Please add any further candidates for these lists here, or on the talk page.)

First men and women

These are the first 12 known PhDs by African-American men and women in mathematics, in alphabetical order for years with multiple doctorate holders, with women first.

Doctoral degrees 1925 to 1975

This list includes PhDs awarded to African-Americans and to African immigrants by academic institutions in the United States.

Doctoral degrees in mathematics education to 1975

This list includes doctorates specifically in mathematics education and doctorates in education by mathematicians/mathematics educators.

Books and articles about African-American mathematicians

This list includes books and dissertations published about individual African-Americans in mathematics, and studies, biographical anthologies or histories dedicated to African-Americans in mathematics. (This list is incomplete. You can help by expanding it.)

Individuals

 Benjamin Banneker:
 Bedini, Silvio A (1999). The life of Benjamin Banneker: the first African-American man of science. Maryland Historical Society.
 Hinman, Bonnie (2000). Benjamin Banneker: American Mathematician and Astronomer (Colonial Leaders).
 David Blackwell:
 Blackwell, David; Wilmot, Nadine (2003). An oral history with David Blackwell. Bancroft Library.
 Black, Robert (2019). David Blackwell and the Deadliest Duel. Royal Fireworks Press. 
 Joseph James Dennis:
 Williams, Sherese LaTrelle (2016). To Humbly Serve: Joseph James Dennis and His Contributions to Clark College. Clark Atlanta University.
 Marjorie Kimbrough
 Kimbrouogh, Marjorie (1991). Accept no limitations: a black woman encounters corporate America. Abingdon Press.
 Shirley Mathis McBay:
 Verheyden-Hilliard, Mary Ellen (1985). Mathematician and Administrator, Shirley Mathis McBay. Equity Institute.
 J. Ernest Wilkins Jr.:
 Nkwanta, Asamoah; Barber, Janet E. (2018). "Episodes in the Life of a Genius: J. Ernest Wilkins Jr." Notices of the American Mathematical Society. Volume 65, Number 2.

Anthologies and studies

 Borum, Viveka; Hilton, Adriel Adon; Walker, Erica (2016). The Role of Black Colleges in the Development of Mathematicians. Journal of Research Initiatives.
 Carlson, Cob; Parks, Yolanda; et al. (1996). Breakthrough: profiles of scientists of color. Working with Numbers. Blackside.
 Dean, Nathaniel (ed) (1997). African Americans in mathematics: DIMACS workshop, June 26–28, 1996. American Mathematical Society.
 Farmer, Vernon L; Shepherd-Wynn, Evelyn (2012). Voices of historical and contemporary Black American pioneers.
 Harmon, Marylen; Guertler, Sherry (1994). Visions of a dream: history makers: contributions of Africans and African Americans in science and mathematics. M.E. Harmon.
 Houston, Johnny L (2000). The History of the National Association of Mathematicians (NAM): The First Thirty (30) Years, 1969–1999. NAM.
 Kenschaft, Patricia Clark (2005). Change is possible: Stories of women and minorities in mathematics.
 Lang, Mozell P. Contributions of African American scientists and mathematicians. Harcourt School Publishers.
 Newell, Victoria; Gipson, Joella; Rich, Waldo L.; Stubblefield, B (1980). Black Mathematicians and Their Works.
 Paul, Richard; Moss, Steven (2015). We Could Not Fail: The First African Americans in the Space Program. University of Texas Press.
 Shetterly, Margot Lee (2016). Hidden Figures: The American dream and the untold story of the black women mathematicians who helped win the space race.
 Walker, Erica N (2014). Beyond Banneker: Black mathematicians and the path to excellence.
 Williams, Lisa D (2000). The trials, tribulations, and triumphs of black faculty in the math and science pipeline: a life history approach (Dissertation). University of Massachusetts at Amherst.
 Williams, Talithia M (2018). Power in numbers: The rebel women of mathematics. Race Point Publishing.

For young people

 Becker, Helaine; Phumiruk, Dow (2018). Counting on Katherine: How Katherine Johnson Saved Apollo 13. Henry Holt and co.
 Pinkney, Andrea Davis (1998). Dear Benjamin Banneker.
 Schwartz, Heather E (2017). NASA Mathematician Katherine Johnson. Lerner Publications.
 Shetterly, Margot Lee; Conkling, Winifred; Freeman, Laura (2018). Hidden Figures: The True Story of Four Black Women and the Space Race. HarperCollins.

List of Wikipedia articles
This list includes Wikipedia articles for people from the African diaspora who have postgraduate degrees in mathematics or statistics, have worked in mathematics, or are known for mathematical accomplishments in the United States (African-Americans). The list is grouped by the time the person's first degree in mathematics was awarded, or when they began their work in mathematics. Individuals are listed alphabetically within time periods. PhDs in mathematics education are included.

Before 1900

Thomas Fuller (1710–1782).
Benjamin Banneker (1731–1806).
Charles Reason (1818–1893).
Kelly Miller (1863–1939) degrees from Howard University, including law degree.

1900s
Dudley Weldon Woodard (1881–1965), degrees from Wilberforce University, University of Chicago, University of Pennsylvania (PhD).

1910s
Elbert Frank Cox (1895–1969), degrees from Indiana University, Cornell University (PhD).
Euphemia Haynes (1890–1980), Smith College, Catholic University of America (PhD).

1920s
Joseph J. Dennis (1905–1977), degrees from Clark College, Northwestern University (PhD).
Angie Turner King (1905–2004), degrees from West Virginia State College, including chemistry, University of Pittsburgh (PhD, mathematics education).
Georgia Caldwell Smith (1909–1961), degrees from University of Kansas, University of Chicago, University of Pittsburgh (PhD).
Dorothy Vaughan (1910–2008), degree from Wilberforce University.

1930s
David Blackwell (1919–2010), degrees from University of Illinois at Urbana–Champaign (PhD).
Marjorie Lee Browne (1914–1979), degrees from Howard University, University of Michigan (PhD).
Katherine Johnson  (1918–2020), degree from West Virginia State College.
Clarence F. Stephens (1917–2018), degrees from Johnson C. Smith University, University of Michigan (PhD).

1940s
Albert Turner Bharucha-Reid (1927–1985), degree from Iowa State University.
Gloria Ford Gilmer, degrees from Morgan State University, University of Pennsylvania, Marquette University (PhD, education).
Evelyn Boyd Granville (born 1924), Smith College, Yale University (PhD).
Mary Winston Jackson (1921–2005), degree from Hampton Institute.
Eleanor Green Dawley Jones (1929-2021), degrees from Howard University, Syracuse University (PhD).
Abdulalim A. Shabazz (1927–2014), degrees from Lincoln University (Pennsylvania), Massachusetts Institute of Technology (MIT), Cornell University (PhD).
Louise Nixon Sutton (1925–2006), degrees from North Carolina A&T State University, New York University (PhD, education).
J. Ernest Wilkins, Jr. (1923–2011), degrees from University of Chicago, New York University (including degrees in engineering).

1950s
Geraldine Claudette Darden (born 1936), degrees from Hampton Institute, University of Illinois, Syracuse University (PhD).
M. Lovenia DeConge-Watson (born 1933), degrees from Seton Hill College, Louisiana State University, St. Louis University (PhD).
Annie Easley (1933–2011), degrees from Xavier University, mathematics at Cleveland State University.
Etta Zuber Falconer (1933–2002), degrees from Fisk University, University of Wisconsin, Emory University (PhD).
William Thomas Fletcher, degrees from North Carolina Central University, University of Idaho (PhD).
Gloria Conyers Hewitt (born 1935), degrees from Fisk University, University of Washington (PhD).
Vivienne Malone-Mayes (1932–1995), degrees from Fisk University, University of Texas (PhD).
Melba Roy Mouton (1929–1990), degrees from Howard University.
Dolores Margaret Richard Spikes (1936–2015), degrees from Southern University, University of Illinois (PhD).
Thyrsa Frazier Svager (1930–1999), degrees from Antioch College, Ohio State University (PhD).
Argelia Velez-Rodriguez (b. 1936 in Cuba), degrees from Marianao Institute, University of Havana (PhD).
Grace Alele Williams (1932–2022), degrees from University of Ibadan, University of Chicago (PhD, education).

1960s
Sylvia D. Trimble Bozeman (born 1947), degrees from Alabama A&M University, Vanderbilt University, Emory University (PhD).
Christine Darden (born 1942), degrees from Hampton Institute, Virginia State University, George Washington University (PhD, engineering).
James A. Donaldson (1941–2019), degrees from Lincoln University (Pennsylvania), University of Illinois at Urbana-Champaign (PhD).
Fern Y. Hunt (born 1948), degrees from Bryn Mawr College, New York University (PhD).
Jeanette Scissum, degrees from Alabama A&M University, computer science PhD.
Raymond L. Johnson (born 1943), degrees from University of Texas at Austin, Rice University (PhD).
Ronald Elbert Mickens (born 1943), degrees from Fisk University, Vanderbilt University (PhD, physics).
Scott W. Williams (born 1943), degrees from Morgan State University, Lehigh University (PhD).
Lloyd Demetrius, degrees from University of Cambridge, University of Chicago (PhD).

1970s
Augustin Banyaga (b. 1947 in Rwanda), degrees from University of Geneva (PhD).
Emery N. Brown, degree from Harvard College and Harvard University (PhD, statistics).
Freeman Alphonsa Hrabowski III (born 1950), degrees from Hampton Institute, University of Illinois (PhD, higher education administration/statistics)
Iris Marie Mack, degrees from Vassar College (double major with physics), University of California, Los Angeles, Harvard University (PhD).
Carolyn Ray Boone Mahoney (born 1946), degrees from Siena College, Ohio University (PhD).
William Alfred Massey (born 1956), degrees from Princeton University, Stanford University (PhD).
Lee Stiff (1949–2021), degrees from University of North Carolina at Chapel Hill, Duke University, North Carolina State University (PhD, education).

1980s
Idris Assani (b. in Niger), degrees from Paris Dauphine University, Pierre and Marie Curie University (PhD, mathematics).
Emery Neal Brown, degrees from Harvard University (PhD, statistics) and Harvard Medical School (MD).
Melvin Currie (born 1948), degrees from Yale University and University of Pittsburgh (PhD, mathematics).
Clifford Victor Johnson (b. 1968 in UK), degrees from Imperial College London and University of Southampton (PhD, mathematics and physics).
Bob Moses (1935–2021), degrees from Hamilton College, New York, and Harvard University (MA, philosophy). Founder of Algebra Project (1982).
Arlie Oswald Petters (b. 1964 in Belize), degrees from City University of New York and Massachusetts Institute of Technology (PhD, mathematics).
Suzanne L. Weekes (b. in Trinidad & Tobago), degrees from Indiana University and University of Michigan (PhD, mathematics and scientific computing).

1990s
Ron Buckmire (b. 1968 in Grenada), degrees from Rensselaer Polytechnic Institute (PhD, mathematics).
Edray Goins (born 1972), degrees from California Institute of Technology and Stanford University (PhD, mathematics).
Rudy Horne (1968–2017), degrees from University of Oklahoma and University of Colorado Boulder (PhD, applied mathematics). Mathematical consultant for the movie Hidden Figures.
Trachette Jackson (born 1972), degrees from Arizona State University and University of Washington (PhD, mathematics).
Chawne Kimber (born 1971), degrees from University of North Carolina and University of Florida (PhD, mathematics).
Marilyn Strutchens (born 1962), degrees from the University of Georgia (PhD, mathematics education).
Aissa Wade (b. 1967  in Senegal), degrees from University Montpellier 2, France (PhD, mathematics).
Talitha Washington (born 1974), degrees from Spelman College and University of Connecticut (PhD, mathematics).

2000s
Carla Cotwright-Williams (born 1973), degrees from California State University, Long Beach, Southern University, and University of Mississippi (PhD, mathematics).
Christina Eubanks-Turner, degrees from Xavier University of Louisiana and University of Nebraska-Lincoln (PhD, mathematics).
Omayra Ortega, degrees from Pomona College and University of Iowa (PhD, mathematics).
Candice Price, degrees from California State University, Chico, San Francisco State University, and University of Iowa (PhD, mathematics).
Dionne Price, degrees from Norfolk State University, University of North Carolina, and Emory University (PhD, biostatistics).
Chelsea Walton (born 1983), degrees from Michigan State University and the University of Michigan (PhD, mathematics).

Talithia Williams, degrees from Spelman College, Howard University, Rice University (PhD, statistics).
Ulrica Wilson, degrees from Spelman College and Emory University (PhD, mathematics).

2010s
 John Urschel (b. 1991 in Canada), degrees from Pennsylvania State University (MS, Mathematics) and the Massachusetts Institute of Technology (Ph.D., Mathematics).

Other notable American mathematicians from the African diaspora

 Gregory Battle (born 1955), degrees from Morehouse College, Washington University in St. Louis (PhD).
 Anthony E. Clement, degrees from Brooklyn College, Graduate Center, CUNY(PhD, mathematics)
 Wilfred Graves, Jr (born 1972), degrees from Massachusetts Institute of Technology, Stanford University, Fuller Theological Seminary (PhD, historical theology).

References

Mathematicians
African-American